Jonas Hilti (born 22 March 2000) is a Liechtensteiner footballer who currently plays for Vaduz II.

International career
He is a member of the Liechtenstein national football team, making his debut in a 2022–23 UEFA Nations League match against Moldova on 25 September 2022. Hilti also made 17 appearances for the Liechtenstein U21.

References

2000 births
Living people
Liechtenstein footballers
Association football defenders
Liechtenstein international footballers
FC Vaduz players